Kattoor may refer to:

 Kattoor, Pathanamthitta
 Kattoor, Alappuzha
 Kattoor, Thrissur

See also
Kattur (disambiguation)